Alphonso Minor Griswold (January 26, 1834 – March 14, 1891) was an American humorist, journalist, and lecturer, known by his pen name The Fat Contributor.

Born in Oneida County, New York, and educated at Hamilton College, he began his career in Buffalo, first working at a small paper called the Times and then at the Republic, where he began penning humorous articles signed "The Fat Contributor". Griswold joined the Cleveland Plain Dealer in 1860 as associate editor, and after nearly five years joined the Cincinnati Evening Times.

He toured the country giving humorous lectures. He died of apoplexy in Sheboygan Falls, Wisconsin, while on tour at the age of 57.

References

1834 births
1891 deaths
American humorists
Journalists from New York (state)
Journalists from Ohio
Hamilton College (New York) alumni
People from Oneida County, New York